Pratap Keshari Deb (birth: 16 October 1972) is an Indian politician from the state of Odisha. In May 2017, he won a bypoll to the Rajya Sabha seat from Odisha constituency which was vacated by Bishnu Charan Das when he was appointed chairman of Odisha State Planning Board. Pratap Deb filed a nomination and won the seat uncontested on 18 May 2017. He will complete the remainder of his term until 1 July 2022.

Pratap Keshari Deb is a member of 16th Assembly of Odisha (2019 - 2024) elected from Aul . Deb had defeated his nearest Congress rival Devendra Sharma by a margin of 55,601 votes. He was inducted into Naveen Patnaik's Cabinet as Industries, Micro, Small and Medium Enterprises, Energy Minister in June 2022.

References 

  

1972 births
Living people
Rajya Sabha members from Odisha
Biju Janata Dal politicians
Odisha MLAs 2019–2024